Leomie Jasmin Francis Anderson (born 14 February 1993) is a British model, fashion designer, and activist. She has walked in four consecutive Victoria's Secret Fashion Shows from 2015 to 2018, and became a Victoria's Secret Angel in 2019. Anderson was included in a 2020 Forbes '30 Under 30' list for the art & culture category.

Career
Anderson, originally from Wandsworth, London, and of Jamaican heritage, began a career as a model when she was scouted at the age of 14. Initially, she wanted to become a fashion journalist. At age 17, she was booked for her first catwalk show by Marc Jacobs, becoming one of the designer's favorites.

In 2011, Anderson appeared on the Channel 4's reality show The Model Agency.

She has walked for brands such as Giorgio Armani, Burberry, Chloé, Fenty Puma, Tom Ford, Tommy Hilfiger, Calvin Klein, Ralph Lauren, Moschino, Oscar de la Renta, Jeremy Scott, Temperley, Vivienne Westwood, and Yeezy. She became one of the faces for her role model, Rihanna’s, brand Fenty Beauty, when it first launched in 2017. Her campaign portfolio includes also Pat McGrath's make-up line, Uniqlo, Topshop, and Jones New York.

In 2015, Anderson was selected for the Victoria's Secret Fashion Show, after third casting, and has since walked in the show for 4 consecutive years. In April 2019, she became, as the sixth Black and first British Black model, Victoria's Secret Angel.

She was ranked as a "Money Girl" by models.com

In 2016, she created the LAPP blog (Leomie Anderson, the Project, the Purpose), later known as LAPP Magazine, to provide insight and awareness about women’s mental health, rights and body consciousness, promoting female empowerment. In part to support the platform, she has founded her own clothing brand, LAPP The Brand, which was launched in September 2016. Anderson developed a line of women’s athletic garments, which can be worn as fashion or as active wear.

As a women's rights activist, Anderson gave two TEDx Talks, and spoke at Oxford and Cambridge universities. She has been vocal about racial discrimination in the modelling industry.

In April 2021, she debuted her podcast, Role Model with Leomie Anderson (Somethin’ Else, Sony Music), to "speak to international superstars who are breaking boundaries and shaping culture."

Awards
 2017 Yahoo’s Diversity in Beauty Awards – Model Activist

Filmography

Television

Notes

External links
 
 

1993 births
Black British fashion people
English female models
Living people
People from Wandsworth
Victoria's Secret Angels
British women fashion designers
Models from London